William Q. "Biff" MacLean Jr. is an American politician who served in the Massachusetts House of Representatives and the Massachusetts Senate.

Early life
MacLean was born on November 4, 1934 in New Bedford, Massachusetts. He attended public schools in Fairhaven, Massachusetts and graduated from the University of Massachusetts. In 1959 he joined the Fairhaven police department as a reserve officer.

Political career
MacLean began his political career as a member of the Fairhaven school committee. In 1960 he was elected to the Massachusetts House of Representatives. He became the House Majority Whip in 1973 and two years later became Majority Leader. He resigned as Majority Leader in July 1978 due to his frustrations with Speaker Thomas W. McGee. Later that year, MacLean challenged incumbent state senator Robert M. Hunt for the seat in the Bristol and Plymouth district. MacLean defeated Hunt 51% to 40% in the Democratic primary and beat Republican Brett W. Thacher 67% to 33% in the general election. He would run unopposed until 1990 when he beat Hunt, who had become a Republican, 67% to 33%.

During his tenure in the legislature, MacLean gained the nickname "Mr. December" for his ability to get bills passed during the last month of the legislative session. He also gained a reputation for working on behalf of a number of special interest groups, including beer distributors, the real estate industry, and racetracks.

Conflict of interest conviction
In 1989, The Boston Globe, reported that after MacLean played a pivotal role in the passage of a bill that allowed PEBSCO Nationwide Retirements Investments to sell its  services to local governments in Massachusetts. MacLean received $1 million in commissions from PEBSCO. In 1990, federal prosecutors convened a grand jury to look into MacLean's dealings with PEBSCO, but due to a lack of witnesses, the case was dropped in 1991.

On February 2, 1993, a Suffolk County grand jury indicted MacLean on two counts of violating a provision in the state conflict-of-interest law that prohibits state employees from having a financial interest in state contracts. According to prosecutors, MacLean received half the fees former Attorney General Edward J. McCormack Jr. made from developing, constructing, and managing Fairhaven Village, a housing development for elderly and low-income residents that received state funding, through Sky High Realty Trust, a trust whose sole beneficiary was MacLean's wife, Marjorie. McLean was also accused of receiving a portion of the money ($278,090) PEBSCO earned by selling its plan to state employees through hidden payments made through Pilgrim Insurance Agency, which was also owned by McCormack.

On February 5, MacLean pleaded guilty to both charges. He was ordered to pay the state $512,000 and serve one year of probation. MacLean has sought to plead nolo contendere, however after three judges refused to take a nolo contendere plea, he agreed to plead guilty so that the case would not be further delayed. 

State law allows the board to invalidate the pensions of state workers who are convicted of crimes "applicable" to their jobs. On September 17, 1993, the state retirement stripped MacLean of his $23,000 a year pension. MacLean appealed the revocation. In 2000, the Massachusetts Supreme Judicial Court upheld the revocation of MacLean's pension.

Personal life
MacLean was married to Martha (George) and after eighteen years divorced, they have three children Doug, Kim and Lauren. MacLean's second wife was to Marjorie (McCarthy) MacLean for eighteen years, until her death from cancer on June 29, 1995. On April 30, 1998 he married Mary Jane Moran O'Donnell, the daughter of Rhode Island State Senator John Moran, in Newport, Rhode Island.

MacLean owns homes in Fairhaven, Nantucket, and Jupiter, Florida.

References

1934 births
Living people
People from Fairhaven, Massachusetts
People from Jupiter, Florida
People from Nantucket, Massachusetts
Insurance agents
Massachusetts state senators
Members of the Massachusetts House of Representatives
University of Massachusetts Amherst alumni
Massachusetts politicians convicted of corruption